Mario Mutsch (born 3 September 1984) is a former professional footballer who played as a defensive midfielder. Born in Belgium, he represented the Luxembourg national team.

Club career
Born in St. Vith, Mutsch started his career at Belgian lower leagues sides Spa and Kelmis (La Calamine) before heading to Germany to play for the Alemannia Aachen reserve team. In summer 2007 he joined Swiss Super League FC Aarau on the suggestion of his former national team coach Jeff Saibene, who was assistant manager at FC Aarau.

On 16 July 2009, it was announced that Mutsch had signed for French Ligue 2 side FC Metz on a free transfer. In 2011, he joined Swiss side FC Sion for only one season and in 2012 he moved on to FC St. Gallen.

International career
Mutsch made his debut for Luxembourg in an October 2005 World Cup qualification match against Russia and by June 2019 he had earned 102 caps, scoring four goals. He has played in 11 FIFA World Cup qualification matches.

Mutsch retired from both club and international football after his Luxembourg record 102nd international appearance, against Madagascar on 2 June 2019.

Personal life
Mutsch was born and raised in the German speaking Community of Belgium. His father is a Luxembourger who grew up in Eastern Belgium, his mother is a Belgian.

Career statistics
Scores and results list Luxembourg's goal tally first, score column indicates score after each Mutsch goal.

See also
List of men's footballers with 100 or more international caps

References

External links
 
 
 Statistics at T-Online.de 
 Swiss Football League profile  
 

1984 births
Living people
People from St. Vith
Luxembourgian people of Belgian descent
Belgian people of Luxembourgian descent
Footballers from Liège Province
Luxembourgian footballers
Belgian footballers
Association football midfielders
Luxembourg international footballers
Alemannia Aachen players
FC Aarau players
FC Metz players
FC Sion players
FC St. Gallen players
FC Progrès Niederkorn players
Swiss Super League players
Ligue 2 players
Luxembourgian expatriate footballers
Luxembourgian expatriate sportspeople in Germany
Expatriate footballers in Germany
Luxembourgian expatriate sportspeople in Switzerland
Expatriate footballers in Switzerland
FIFA Century Club